The Treaty of Vienna, concluded on 27 May 1657, was an Austro–Polish alliance during the Second Northern War. 

After Habsburg emperor Ferdinand III had agreed to enter the war on the anti-Swedish side and support the Polish king John II Casimir with 4,000 troops in the ineffective Treaty of Vienna (1656), his death in April 1657 made way for a more substantial treaty with his successor Leopold I. By this treaty, Leopold I promised to aid John II Casimir with 12,000 troops against the Swedish-Brandenburgian alliance. These troops were to be maintained at Polish expense, and crossed the Polish border in June.

Sources

References

Bibliography

Second Northern War
Vienna (1657)
Vienna (1657)
17th-century military alliances
Military alliances involving the Holy Roman Empire
1657 treaties
1657 in Europe
1657 in the Habsburg monarchy
1657 in the Polish–Lithuanian Commonwealth
1657 in Sweden
17th century in Vienna
Habsburg monarchy–Polish–Lithuanian Commonwealth relations